Triumvirate is a 1973 collaboration by Mike Bloomfield, John Hammond, Jr. and Dr. John.  Although other recordings were done by the three, this is the only album they released together.

Track listing

Personnel
 Mike Bloomfield – lead guitar, keyboards, vocals
 John Hammond, Jr. – guitar, harmonica, lead vocals
 Dr. John – banjo, guitar, keyboards, organ, percussion, piano, vocals, arrangements
 Thomas Jefferson Kaye – guitar, backing vocals
 Chris Ethridge – bass
 Jim Gordon – baritone saxophone
 Jim Josea – soprano saxophone, alto saxophone, tenor saxophone
 Jerry Jumonville – tenor and alto saxophone
 George Bohanon – trombone
 Richard "Blue" Mitchell – trumpet
 Jessie Hill – vocals, backing vocals
 Lorraine Rebennack – bass, backing vocals
 Freddie Staehle – drums
 John Boudreaux – percussion
 Bennie Parks – percussion
 Jessie Smith, Robbie Montgomery – backing vocals
Technical
Pete Weiss, Roger Nichols, Tony Reale - engineer
Ron Coro - art direction
 Jim Marshall – photography

References

1973 albums
Mike Bloomfield albums
Dr. John albums
Columbia Records albums
John P. Hammond albums
Collaborative albums